Global Witness is an international NGO established in 1993 that works to break the links between natural resource exploitation, conflict, poverty, corruption, and human rights abuses worldwide. The organisation has offices in London and Washington, D.C. 

Global Witness states that it does not have any political affiliation. Mike Davis has been the organisation's CEO since 2020.

Profile

Global Witness states that its goals are to expose the corrupt exploitation of natural resources and international trade systems, to drive campaigns that end impunity, resource linked conflict, and human rights and environmental abuses. The organisation explores how diamonds and other natural resources can fund conflict or fuel corruption. It carries out investigations into the involvement of specific individuals and business entities in activities such as illegal and unsustainable forest exploitation, and corruption in oil, gas and mining industries.

Global Witness’ methodology combines investigative research, publishing reports and conducting advocacy campaigns. Reports are disseminated to governments, intergovernmental organizations, civil society and the media. This is intended to shape global policy and change international thinking about the extraction and trading of natural resources and the impacts that corrupt and unsustainable exploitation can have upon development, human rights and geopolitical and economic stability.

Projects

Global Witness has worked on diamonds, oil, timber, cocoa, gas, gold and other minerals. It has undertaken investigations and case studies in Cambodia, Angola, Liberia, DR Congo, Equatorial Guinea, Kazakhstan, Burma, Indonesia, Zimbabwe, Turkmenistan and Ivory Coast. It has also helped to set up international initiatives such as the Extractive Industries Transparency Initiative, the Kimberley Process, and the Publish What You Pay coalition. (Global Witness withdrew from the Kimberley Process in 2011, saying it is no longer working.)

The organization's first campaign involved work against  the trade of illegal timber between Cambodia and Thailand which was funding the Khmer Rouge guerrillas.

Global Witness argues that natural resources can be, and have been, exploited to fund armies and militias who murder, rape, and commit other human rights abuses against civilians. It says that "natural resources can potentially be used to negotiate and maintain peace" and "could be the key to ending Africa's poverty".

The organisation campaigns to protect human rights defenders targeted because of their work to prevent natural resource exploitation. An investigation by Global Witness in April 2014 revealed there were nearly three times as many environmental defenders killed in 2012 than 10 years previously. Global Witness documented 147 deaths in 2012, compared to 51 in 2002. In Brazil, 448 activists defending natural resources were killed between 2002 and 2013, in Honduras 109, Peru 58, the Philippines 67, and Thailand 16. Many of those facing threats are ordinary people opposing land grabs, mining operations and the industrial timber trade, often forced from their homes and severely threatened by environmental devastation. Others have been killed for protests over hydroelectric dams, pollution and wildlife conservation. By 2019, Global Witness were documenting 212 such deaths in the year.

Cambodia 

Global Witness’s first campaign was in Cambodia in the 1990s where the Khmer Rouge was smuggling timber into Thailand. The Observer newspaper attributed the cessation to Global Witness's "detailed and accurate reporting".

After a report implicating relatives of Prime Minister Hun Sen and other senior government officials, the prime minister's brother, Hun Neng, a provincial governor, was quoted in a Cambodian newspaper as saying if anyone from Global Witness returned to Cambodia, he would "hit them until their heads are broken." In 2009, Global Witness released Country for Sale, a report on corruption in the allocation of Cambodia's natural resource licenses. In 2010 the report, Shifting Sand, was published. It examined sand dredging for export to Singapore. The report claimed that the trade was "monopolised by two prominent Cambodian senators with close ties to Prime Minister Hun Sen".

Conflict diamonds and Sierra Leone 
In 1998 Global Witness released the report, A Rough Trade: The Role of Companies and Governments in the Angolan Conflict, describing the role of the international diamond trade in funding the Angolan Civil War.

As part of its campaign against conflict diamonds, Global Witness helped establish the Kimberley Process Certification Scheme (KCPS). The international governmental certification scheme  was set up to stop to trade in blood diamonds, requiring governments to certify that shipments of rough diamonds are conflict-free. Like many other Sub-Saharan African (SSA) countries, Sierra Leone is endowed with oil and mineral resources amid social inequality, high prevalence of poverty, and conflict.

Under rebel movements headed by Charles Taylor, who dominated the diamond industry, diamonds were being traded for guns with the Revolutionary United Front (RUF).  This rebel group alone earned as much as US$125 m. In 1998, Global Witness stated that diamonds were spurring those conflicts. Backed by investigation done by the UN in 2000, it was then verified that the gems were being smuggled out of eastern Sierra Leone through Liberia, and subsequently into the international market.  Sanctions were later imposed by the UN on Liberian diamonds in March 2001.

On July 19, 2000, the World Diamond Congress adopted at Antwerp a resolution to reinforce the diamond industry's ability to block sales of conflict diamonds. Thereafter, with growing international pressure from Global Witness and other NGOs, meetings were hosted with diamond-producing countries over three years, concluding in the establishment of an international diamond certification scheme in January 2003.  The certification system on the export and import of diamonds, known as the KCPS, was called by the resolution, imposing legislation in all countries to accept shipment of only officially sealed packages of diamonds accompanied by a KP certificate guaranteeing that they were conflict-free. Anyone found trafficking conflict diamonds will be indicted of criminal charges, while bans were to be imposed on individuals found trading those stones from diamond bourses under the World Federation of Diamond Bourses.

The Kimberley Process (KP) in Sierra Leone was efficient in limiting the flow of conflict diamonds.  More importantly, the KP assisted in restoring peace and security in the lives of these people, and, by creating stability in these environments, it spurred their development.  It was successful at channelling larger amounts of diamonds into the international market, boosting government revenues, and consequently aiding in tackling development concerns.  In 2006, an estimated US$125 m worth of diamonds were legally exported from Sierra Leone, compared to almost none in the 1990s.

Despite its success, nine years later, on 5 December 2011, Global Witness announced that it has left the KP, stating that the scheme's main flaws have not been mended as governments no longer continue to show interest in reform.

Oil, gas, and mining 
Global Witness campaigns for greater transparency in the oil, gas, and mining sectors. It is a founding member of the Publish What You Pay (PWYP) coalition, which advocates "the mandatory disclosure of company payments and government revenues from the oil, gas, and mining sector". Over 300 civil society groups worldwide are member of PWYP. Other PWYP founders include CAFOD, Oxfam, Save the Children UK, Transparency International UK, and George Soros, Chairman of the Open Society Institute.

Global Witness helped establish the Extractive Industries Transparency Initiative (EITI), which was announced by then UK Prime Minister Tony Blair at the World Summit on Sustainable Development in Johannesburg in September 2002 and formally endorsed by the World Bank in December 2003. The EITI is a result of the efforts of the PWYP campaigners. It is now supported by a majority of the world's oil, mining and gas companies and institutional investors, in total worth US$8.3 trillion. Global Witness is a member of the EITI International Advisory Group and sits on the EITI board.

Democratic Republic of Congo 
Global Witness is active on a range of issues in the Democratic Republic of Congo (DRC). Their website section on DRC reads, "Politicians, military and militia groups have plundered the country's natural wealth and used it to enrich themselves at the detriment of the population." Global Witness has lobbied the UK government and the UN Security Council to stop the trade in minerals fuelling war in eastern Congo.

Global Witness defines conflict resources as "natural resources whose systematic exploitation and trade in a context of conflict contribute to, benefit from or result in the commission of serious violations of human rights, violations of international humanitarian law or violations amounting to crimes under international law."

Forests 
Global Witness has produced reports on how timber helped to fund the civil war in Liberia and also looked at timber smuggling from Burma into China. In 2010, Global Witness launched a court case in France against DLH, a company that they allege bought timber from Liberian companies during the civil war between 2001 and 2003, thereby providing support to Charles Taylor's regime.

Global Witness describes forests as the "last bastion against climate change", with deforestation accounting for 18 percent of total global carbon dioxide emissions. On UN efforts to broker a deal on "Reducing emissions from deforestation and forest degradation" (REDD) Global Witness said: "REDD carries considerable risks for forests and local communities and will only succeed if civil society is engaged as an independent watchdog to ensure that the money is used in accordance with national laws and international guidelines."

Global Witness criticized the World Bank-endorsed approach of encouraging industrial export-based logging as a means to economic growth in developing countries, which, it argues, has been repeatedly shown to fail. Instead, Global Witness advocates management strategies that benefit the communities that are dependent on forests, their home countries, the environment, and treats forests as an "international asset".

Recent

Anonymous companies 
Global Witness campaigns against anonymous companies and for registers of beneficial ownership. Anonymous companies are a legal business practice but can be used for purposes such as laundering money from criminal activity, financing terrorism, or evading taxes.

Banks 
In 2009 Global Witness launched a campaign on the role of banks in facilitating corruption. Its report, Undue Diligence, names some of the major banks that have done business with corrupt regimes. It argues that "by accepting these customers, banks are assisting those who are using state assets to enrich themselves or brutalise their own people" and that "this corruption denies the world's poorest people the chance to lift themselves out of poverty and leaves them dependent on aid."

Global Witness is on the Coordinating Committee of Taskforce on Financial Integrity and Economic Development, and is a member of BankTrack, and the UNCAC Coalition of Civil Society Organisations. In May 2009, Global Witness employee, Anthea Lawson, testified before the U.S. House Financial Services Committee on "Capital Loss, Corruption and the Role of Western Financial Institutions". In a letter to The Guardian dated 9 February 2010, Ms Lawson accused UK banks of "demonstrated complicity" in corruption.

Sudan 
Global Witness has campaigned for transparency in Sudan's oil industry. Global Witness published Fuelling Mistrust in June 2009, a report that detailed discrepancies of up to 26 percent between the production figures published by the Sudanese government and those published by the main oil company operating in the region, CNPC. A peace deal between the north and the south was predicated on an agreement to share the revenues from oil.

Zimbabwe diamonds 
In June 2010, Global Witness criticized Zimbabwe for large-scale human rights abuses committed in the Marange diamond fields. It published a report Return of the Blood Diamond which criticised the Kimberley Process Certification Scheme for repeatedly failing to react effectively to the crisis in Zimbabwe. In July 2010 Tendai Midzi, writing in The Zimbabwe Guardian, accused Global Witness and Partnership Africa Canada of being "but a figment of the western governments they represent".

Malaysia

Global Witness exposed corruption in land deals within the administration of Taib Mahmud, the chief minister of the state of Sarawak in Malaysia through the video titled "Inside Malaysia's Shadow State." The video featured footage of conversations with relatives of Taib and their lawyer where Global Witness agents posed as potential investors.

2020: 227 environmental activists killed worldwide 
In 2019, Global Witness recorded the murders of 212 environmental activists, making it the worst year since this recording process began, in 2012. This was up from the number of 197 killed in 2018. 2020 saw a further rise in cases, with 227 killed.

Honors and awards
Global Witness and Partnership Africa Canada were jointly nominated by U.S. House of Representatives and Senate members for the 2003 Nobel Peace Prize for work on links between conflict and diamonds in several African countries.
 Winner of the Gleitsman Foundation prize for international activism (2005)
 Winner of the Center for Global Development/Foreign Policy Magazine Commitment to Development Ideas in Action Award (2007)
 Recipient of the Allard Prize for International Integrity (2013 Honourable Mention)
 Charmian Gooch, one of the three founding Directors of Global Witness, was awarded the Ted Prize in 2014. Her stated Wish was 'for us to know who owns and controls companies, so that they can no longer be used anonymously against the public good. Let's ignite world opinion, change the law, and together launch a new era of openness in business.'
 Winner of the Skoll Award for Social Entrepreneurship 2014
Co-winner of the Sheila McKechnie Foundation's 2021 David and Goliath Award, for the successful campaign to stop the UK Government's multi-billion financing for fossil fuels overseas. Global Witness campaigner Adam McGibbon coordinated the campaign.

Income
The majority of Global Witness funding comes from grants made by foundations, governments, and charities. One of their main benefactors is the Open Society Institute, which also funds Human Rights Watch. Global Witness also receives money from the Norwegian and British governments, the Adessium Foundation, and Oxfam Novib.

In an interview in The Guardian in 2007, Patrick Alley, one of the founding directors, rejected the claim that receiving money from governments could bias their campaigns: "Being campaign-led, rather than funding-led, means that our independence is never comprised," he argued. "The Department for Trade and Industry did once ask if we'd like to sign a confidentiality clause. We said we wouldn't take the funding under those conditions. No other government has ever tried to impose any restrictions."

From December 2008 to November 2009 Global Witness's income was £3,831,831. Of this, approximately 61 percent came in the form of grants from private trusts and foundations, 33 percent from governments, three percent from multi-lateral and non governmental organisations, and three percent from bank interest and other sources. Global Witness says it spends 75 percent of its funds on campaigns, seven percent on communication and fundraising, and 18 percent on support and governance. GW's annual report for 2021 showed the charity's annual income falling from £11.4 to £10.1 million from 2020-2021.

See also
 Asset forfeiture
 Group of States Against Corruption
 International Anti-Corruption Academy
 International Anti-Corruption Day
 ISO 37001 Anti-bribery management systems
 OECD Anti-Bribery Convention
 Transparency International
 United Nations Convention against Corruption

References

External links

Anti-corruption non-governmental organizations
Blood diamonds
International environmental organizations
International human rights organizations
International organisations based in London
Resource extraction
Organizations established in 1993
1993 establishments in England